Recalde might refer to:

 Andrés Recalde, Uruguayan boxer
 Carlos Recalde, Paraguayan footballer
 Eleuterio Recalde, Paraguayan chess master
 Errekalde, a district of Bilbao called Recalde in Spanish
 Juan Martínez de Recalde, Spanish admiral
 Jorge Recalde, Argentine rally driver
 Mariano Recalde, Argentine politician